Live at Rockpalast is the first live video by American blues rock musician Joe Bonamassa. Recorded on June 28, 2005 for the German television show Rockpalast, it was released on February 7, 2006 by Premier Artists.

Track listing

Personnel
Musical performers
Joe Bonamassa – guitar, vocals
Eric Czar – bass
Kenny Kramme – drums

References

2006 video albums
Joe Bonamassa albums